Steven Hollis Sweeney (born September 6, 1950) is a former American football wide receiver in the National Football League (NFL) who played for the Oakland Raiders. He played college football for the California Golden Bears.

References

1950 births
Living people
American football wide receivers
Oakland Raiders players
California Golden Bears football players